Megan Bell (born 17 April 2001) is a Northern Irish footballer who plays as a midfielder for Rangers in the Scottish Women's Premier League (SWPL) and Northern Ireland.

Club career

Linfield
On 19 August 2015, 14-year-old Bell scored two goals for Linfield on her senior debut in a 6–1 home win over Sion Swifts. She won three consecutive Women's Premiership titles with Linfield between 2016 and 2018.

Durham
On 9 July 2019, Bell signed with English FA Women's Championship team Durham. The move coincided will Bell starting a degree in sport, physical activity and exercise at Durham University. On 18 August 2019, she made her debut for the team in the season opener against Leicester City, scoring in the 7th minute of a 5–1 win. After 14 appearances in all competitions in the first half of the season, Bell announced her departure from semi-professional Durham in January 2020 in order to concentrate solely on football.

Rangers
On 5 January 2020, Bell became a full-time footballer, signing with professional SWPL club Rangers.

International career
On 28 November 2017, Bell made her senior debut for Northern Ireland aged 16 years 7 months, starting in a 3–1 2019 World Cup qualifying win away to Slovakia. On 2 March 2018, Bell scored her first international goal in a 1–1 draw against Romania at the 2018 Turkish Women's Cup friendly tournament.

Honours

Club
Linfield
Women's Premiership: 2016, 2017, 2018
IFA Women's Challenge Cup: 2016
Rangers
 Scottish Women's Premier League: 2021-22,

References

External links
 
 
 

2001 births
Living people
Women's association footballers from Northern Ireland
Northern Ireland women's international footballers
Women's association football midfielders
Durham W.F.C. players
Rangers W.F.C. players
Scottish Women's Premier League players
Linfield Ladies F.C. players
Women's Premiership (Northern Ireland) players